Lewis Tierney (born 20 October 1994) is a former rugby league footballer who played on the  or at .

He started his professional career in 2013 with the Wigan Warriors in the Super League, and spent time on loan at Workington Town. He joined the Catalans Dragons in 2017, and played for them in the 2018 Challenge Cup final. He played for Leigh Centurions for one season before announcing his retirement in 2021. Tierney was also a Scotland international, and was capped six times between 2016 and 2018.

Early life
Tierney was born in Wigan, Greater Manchester, England and is the eldest son of Jason Robinson. His parents separated shortly after his birth, and his mother re-married Paul Tierney. His brother Patrick is a professional cyclist.

Club career

Wigan Warriors
Tierney made his Super League début for Wigan in June 2013, scoring a try in a 33–32 victory over Widnes Vikings. In 2014 and 2015, Tierney spent time on dual registration at Workington Town where he made 25 appearances scoring 6 tries in his time in Cumbria. In 2016 Tierney won his first major piece of silverware after Wigan beat Warrington in the Super League Grand Final; he became the first son to follow his father's footsteps and win a Grand Final.

In July 2017, Tierney was loaned to Catalans Dragons until the end of the season, where he played in their Million Pound Game victory over Leigh to stay in Super League.

Catalans Dragons
In October 2017, Tierney signed a two-year deal at Catalans after a successful loan period in 2017.

He played in the 2018 Challenge Cup Final victory over the Warrington Wolves at Wembley Stadium.

Leigh Centurions
On 26 December 2020 it was announced that Tierney had signed for the Leigh Centurions for the 2021 season.

Tierney announced his retirement in November 2021.

International career
Via his heritage, Tierney is eligible to represent both Scotland and Jamaica through his paternal grandmother and paternal grandfather, respectively.

Tierney made his international debut for Scotland in the 2016 Four Nations. He played in two of Scotland's games and scored one try.

Honours
Super League: 2016
Million Pound Game: 2017
World Club Challenge: 2017
Challenge Cup: 2018

References

External links

Catalans Dragons profile
Wigan Warriors profile
SL profile
2017 RLWC profile

1994 births
Living people
Catalans Dragons players
English rugby league players
English people of Jamaican descent
English people of Scottish descent
Leigh Leopards players
Rugby league fullbacks
Rugby league wingers
Rugby league players from Wigan
Scotland national rugby league team players
Wigan Warriors players
Workington Town players